Sports Health: A Multidisciplinary Approach is a bimonthly peer-reviewed medical journal that covers research in the field of sports medicine. Its editor-in-chief is Edward M. Wojtys (University of Michigan). The journal was established in 2009 and is currently published by SAGE Publications in association with the American Orthopedic Society for Sports Medicine.

Abstracting and indexing 
Sports Health is abstracted and indexed in CAB International, SafetyLit, and Scopus.

External links 
 

SAGE Publishing academic journals
English-language journals
Bimonthly journals
Sports medicine journals
Orthopedics journals
Publications established in 2009